Tateno (written: 立野) is a Japanese surname. Notable people with the surname include:

, Japanese voice actress
, Japanese manga artist
, Japanese professional wrestler
Tetsuya Tateno (born 1991), Japanese hurdler

See also
, train station in Minamiaso, Kumamoto Prefecture, Japan

Japanese-language surnames